

A sex on the beach is an alcoholic cocktail containing vodka, peach schnapps, orange juice and cranberry juice. It is an International Bartenders Association Official Cocktail.

General types
There are two general types of the cocktail:

 The IBA official cocktail is made from vodka, peach schnapps, orange juice, and cranberry juice.
 The 2008 Mr. Boston Official Bartender's Guide (67th edition) provides an alternative recipe made from vodka, Chambord, Midori Melon Liqueur, pineapple juice, and cranberry juice.

The drink is built over ice in a highball glass and garnished with an orange slice. Sometimes they are mixed in smaller amounts and served as a shooter.

Variations

Some derivative variations have their own names:
 A "sex in the driveway" is a sex on the beach with orange juice and cranberry juice replaced with blue curaçao and Sprite.
 A "woo woo" is a sex on the beach without orange juice.
 The alcohol-free variation is sometimes referred to as "safe sex on the beach", "cuddles on the beach", or "virgin(s) on the beach".

References

External links 

 IBA official cocktail recipe

Cocktails with fruit liqueur
Cocktails with vodka
Cocktails with cranberry juice
Cocktails with orange juice